Jason Osborne (born 20 March 1994) is a German former rower and current professional road cyclist, who currently rides for UCI WorldTeam . He won silver as part of the German team in the lightweight men's quadruple sculls at the 2013 World Rowing Championships in Chungju, Korea. He has also won medals in a number of competitions in the World Rowing Cup and European Championships. He competed in the men's lightweight double sculls event at the 2016 Summer Olympics.

On 9 December 2020, he won the first edition of the UCI Cycling Esports World Championships, organised on the online cycling platform Zwift. After this result, he was signed as a stagiaire for UCI WorldTeam .

Major results 
2020
 1st  UCI Esports World Championships
2021
 2nd  2020 Summer Olympics
2022
 3rd  UCI Esports World Championships

References

External links
 

1994 births
Living people
German male rowers
Olympic rowers of Germany
Rowers at the 2016 Summer Olympics
Sportspeople from Mainz
World Rowing Championships medalists for Germany
German male cyclists
Rowers at the 2020 Summer Olympics
Medalists at the 2020 Summer Olympics
Olympic medalists in rowing
Olympic silver medalists for Germany
Cyclists from Rhineland-Palatinate